West Guihua Road is the western terminus of the Fuyang section of Line 6 of the Hangzhou Metro in China. It was opened on 30 December 2020, together with the Line 6. It is located in downtown Fuyang District of Hangzhou.

Gallery

References 

Railway stations in Zhejiang
Railway stations in China opened in 2020
Hangzhou Metro stations